William Emerson (16 December 1891 – 19 January 1961) was an Irish football player, who played as a midfielder for Burnley and Glentoran.

Club career
A talented right half, Billy Emerson sprang from the Owen O'Cork club on east Belfast's Beersbridge Road, a little club that reared many young players for its big league neighbours Glentoran.

After being snapped up by the Glens in 1912, he made five appearances, scoring three goals in wins against Derry City and Shelbourne. Glentoran finished as champions that season and the following year, Emerson was part of the successful team that lifted both the Irish Cup and City Cup. He was also part of the squad that traveled to the continent and brought back the Vienna Cup. William Emerson made almost 300 appearances for Glentoran before joining Burnley during the 1921–22 season.

Emerson first met the Burnley team in Vienna in 1914 when his club toured Europe and Burnley secured his transfer towards the end of the 1921–22 season. Emerson made his debut for the then reigning league champions in front of 30,000 spectators in a 1-1 draw with Cardiff City. He spent parts of three seasons at Turf Moor playing 45 times, but like some of his Glentoran colleagues before him, moved back to the Oval.

After departing Burnley, Billy Emerson returned to Belfast where he played with Glentoran for two more years until 1926. In his two spells at the Oval, Emerson made more than 300 appearances. He also played with Glentoran's cross city rivals Linfield and also enjoyed two spells back in east Belfast with Dundela.

International career

Emerson earned his first cap for pre-partition Ireland against England in October 1919. He would earn a further 10 caps for Ireland, scoring once. Five of his caps were earned at Burnley while the remaining six he won while on Glentoran's books. His six caps while at Glentoran makes him the most capped player in the club's history.

All 11 of Emerson's Ireland caps came in Home International Championship games. His last cap came on 20 October 1923 in a 2-1 victory over England in Belfast.

References

External links
Northern Ireland's Footballing Greats
The Glentoran-Burnley connection
William Emerson at Clarets Mad
The Northern Ireland-Glentoran connection

1891 births
1961 deaths
Irish association footballers (before 1923)
Burnley F.C. players
Glentoran F.C. players
Dundela F.C. players
Pre-1950 IFA international footballers
People from Enniskillen
Willowfield F.C. players
Linfield F.C. players
Association football midfielders
Ireland (IFA) wartime international footballers
Sportspeople from County Fermanagh